Weverse (also stylized as WeVerse; : romanized: wibeoseu) is a Korean mobile app and web platform created by South Korean entertainment company Hybe Corporation. The app specializes in hosting multimedia content and artist-to-fan communications for musicians. Its accompanying e-commerce app, Weverse Shop (formerly known as Weply), sells subscriptions for content on Weverse, artist-related products, and merchandise.

Weverse hosts a variety of free and subscription content including educational and entertainment videos, Instagram Story-style updates, and artist-to-fan interactions and platforms for users to connect with each other. The app is also used to publish official statements by Hybe (formerly Big Hit Entertainment) on behalf of artists in its labels.

The software was developed by Hybe's technology subsidiary Weverse Company (formerly beNX). By March 2020, Weverse had 1.4 million daily users and Weverse Shop over 1.8 million users from 200 countries. As of 2022, Weverse has over 6.8 million monthly users.

Development 
The app was developed by Weverse Company (formerly beNX), a subsidiary technology company of Hybe Corporation (formerly Big Hit Entertainment) specializing in digital platforms and customer service. According to Weverse Company president, Seo Wooseok, the app was developed to offer a platform for K-pop artists to interact with fans "on a deeper level" than that offered by YouTube or Twitter, which emphasize content delivery over communication. Hybe co-CEO Lenzo Yoon characterized the app as a "one-stop service within the music industry."

According to Jenny Zha, CEO of the digital media consultancy firm Infinitize, K-pop "market leaders like BTS", who have amassed significant fan followings, no longer need to focus on being discovered but rather on monetization and ownership of their content. Zha, in an interview with Billboard, explained that "labels want to [...] create an asset they can own and mobilize for other artists and ventures because they know that fans will follow to where the content is. It creates more security for the label for the long term."

Hybe launched the e-commerce platform Weply in June 2019. It later became the app Weverse Shop.

News of the app's development was first announced in October 2019 through an advertisement shown at the beginning of BTS's three-day Love Yourself: Speak Yourself stadium tour in Seoul, South Korea. The advertisement played simultaneously to 130,000 in-person concertgoers, as well as viewers watching via live-stream and in movie theaters.

On January 27, 2021, Naver Corporation announced the transfer of their V-Live service to Weverse Company and its integration with the Weverse platform.

Platforms 
Weverse is currently available as a website, an entertainment and communication-focused app of the same name, and an e-commerce app called Weverse Shop. Both apps are available for free for iOS on the Apple App Store and for Android on the Google Play Store. The Weverse web and app platforms host a variety of free and subscription content including videos, Instagram Story-style updates, and artist-to-fan interactions and platforms for users to connect with each other. The Weverse Shop website and app sell subscriptions for individual series on Weverse, as well as fan memberships and merchandise for the groups on its platform.

Artists

Former

Content

BTS 
BTS joined Weverse on July 1, 2019.

BTS announced during the finale of its Love Yourself: Speak Yourself stadium tour in Seoul that the fourth season of its annual reality show, Bon Voyage, would be leaving the Korean video streaming service V Live, which hosted its first three seasons, for the new platform Weverse. The fourth season of Bon Voyage is available by direct purchase on the Weverse Shop app or with the purchase of an annual membership for BTS's global fan club.

In August 2019, BTS launched a six-episode mini-documentary series for purchase on Weverse entitle Bring the Soul: Docu-Series, which expands on BTS's 2019 documentary film Bring the Soul: The Movie. The first episode aired on Weverse on August 27 and concluded on October 1. Each episode centered on a theme related to the group's Love Yourself album series and showcased content from the 2018 Love Yourself world tour.

On March 22, 2020, Hybe Corporation announced the launch of a video series entitled "Learn Korean With BTS" on the social media app Weverse. The project was first mentioned in February during a live-streamed press release by Big Hit Labels on YouTube, in which Bang Si-Hyuk explained that the project intended to "make it easy and fun for global fans who have difficulty enjoying BTS' music and contents due to the language barrier." The series consists of thirty three-minute lessons on Korean expressions and grammar using footage from existing BTS content on YouTube and VLive, such as Run BTS and "Bangtan Bombs." The videos were developed in collaboration with experts at the Korean Language Content Institute and Hankuk University of Foreign Studies. The first three episodes were released on March 24, with subsequent videos posted weekly on Mondays., which later led to the creation of Hybe's educational division, Hybe EDU.

GFriend 

GFriend joined Weverse on August 1, 2019.

On July 1, 2021, following the end of GFriend's contract with Source Music on May 22, several changes were made to GFriend's Weverse, with features such as creating new posts and editing profiles being disabled. However, other features are still available.

Concerts

Weverse Concerts

See also 
 Hybe Corporation

Notes

References

External links 
 Official website

Social networking services
Live streaming services
Hybe Corporation